Apoorva Sangama is a 1984 Indian Kannada-language film directed by Y. R. Swamy. It stars Rajkumar, Shankar Nag and Ambika. The music of the film was composed by Upendra Kumar. The movie saw a theatrical run of 16 weeks. The film was a remake of Hindi film Johny Mera Naam.

Cast
 Rajkumar as Gopi Krishna / Santhosh 
 Shankar Nag as Harish / Suresh 
 Ambika as Tara 
 T. N. Balakrishna as Bhujang
 Thoogudeepa Srinivas as Vishwanath
 Vajramuni as Danraj / Rao Bahadur Saheb
 Pandari Bai as Mother
 M. S. Umesh as Shivarama
 Roopa Chakravarty  as Mala 
 Janakamma
 Lavanya
 Baby Sonal

Production
When the film was under production, it was titled Anireekshita Milana (Unexpected Meeting).

Soundtrack

References

External links
 
 Apoorva Sangama songs
 Apoorva Sangama on Youtube

1984 films
Kannada remakes of Hindi films
1980s Kannada-language films
Indian spy films
Films scored by Upendra Kumar
Films directed by Y. R. Swamy